Madalan is a rural locality (a station) in Takhtamygdinsky Selsoviet of Skovorodinsky District, Amur Oblast, Russia. The population was 367 as of 2018. There are 9 streets.

Geography 
Madalan is located 61 km west of Skovorodino (the district's administrative centre) by road. Oldoy is the nearest rural locality.

References 

Rural localities in Skovorodinsky District